Nicola Fratoianni (born 4 October 1972) is an Italian politician, member of the Chamber of Deputies and Secretary of Italian Left from 2017 to 2019 and again since 2021.

Biography
Fratoianni was born in Pisa to parents from Ururi, province of Campobasso, Molise, Southern Italy.

Fratoianni is considered the leader of the left-wing faction, which opposed an alliance with the centre-left Democratic Party when it was led by Matteo Renzi. Fratoianni's aim is to create a left-wing party inspired by the Greek Syriza of Alexis Tsipras and the Spanish Podemos of Pablo Iglesias Turrión.

He's an atheist.

References

1972 births
Living people
Left Ecology Freedom politicians
Italian Left politicians
21st-century Italian politicians
Italian atheists
Deputies of Legislature XVII of Italy
Deputies of Legislature XVIII of Italy
Deputies of Legislature XIX of Italy
People from Pisa
University of Pisa alumni